Abell 400 is a galaxy cluster which contains the galaxy NGC 1128 with two supermassive black holes (3C 75) spiraling towards merger.

These two supermassive black holes are contained in NGC 1128. The galaxy, microwave radio jets, multi-million degree X-ray producing gas and resultant radio source is known as 3C 75. X-ray source 2A 0252+060 (1H 0253+058, XRS 02522+060) may be some additional or other portion of Abell 400.

The black holes are an estimated 25,000 light years apart, and thus will take millions of years to collide. Should the two supermassive black holes merge, they will form a single super-supermassive black hole.

See also
 Abell catalogue
 List of Abell clusters
 NGC 1128
 3C 75

References

External links
 Pair of black holes locked in death dance (CNN) Thursday, April 6, 2006; Posted: 2:46 p.m. EDT (18:46 GMT)
 Black Holes Bound to Merge (SPACE.com) 6 April 2006 11:48 am ET
 Black Holes Dance With Incredible Violence (SpaceDaily) Apr 12, 2006
 Study Finds Two Supermassive Black Holes Spiraling Toward Collision (Newswise) Apr 6, 2006

 
0400
Abell richness class 1
Galaxy clusters
Cetus (constellation)